Millicent Borges Accardi is a Portuguese-American poet who lives in California. She has received literary fellowships from the National Endowment for the Arts (NEA), Fulbright, CantoMundo, the California Arts Council, Foundation for Contemporary Arts, FCA Emergency Grants COVID-19, Barbara Deming Foundation, and Formby Special Collections at Texas Tech University for research on the writer/activist Key Boyle.

Her book, Through a Grainy Landscape, a collection of poetry based on contemporary Portuguese literature is with New Meridian Arts, 2021. Other  poetry collections include QUarantine Highway, (FlowerSong Press), Only More So, (Salmon Poetry, Ireland), Injuring Eternity with World Nouveau She also has a chapbook, Woman on a Shaky Bridge, with Finishing Line Press.

Her articles can be found at The Writers Chronicle, Association of Writers & Writing Programs.  ACM (Another Chicago Magazine, Poets Quarterly, The Portuguese American Journal, Portuguese-American Review, and The Topanga Messenger. Interview subjects have included Grammy Director Michael Greene; poets W.S. Merwin and Carl Dennis; writers Frank X. Gaspar, Sam Pereira, Jacinto Lucas Pires, Donna Freitas (Sex and the Soul), and Nuno Júdice; Paulette Rapp (daughter of The Bickersons writer), Stephen Rebello (Alfred Hitchcock and the Making of Psycho), playwright Bill Bozzone, CantoMundo, and Portuguese-American scholar Deolinda Adão.

Borges Accardi's work has appeared in over 150 publications, including Nimrod, Tampa Review, New Letters and The Wallace Stevens Journal, as well as in Boomer Girls (Iowa Press) and Chopin with Cherries (Moonrise Press) anthologies.
Artist residencies include Yaddo, Jentel, Vermont Studio, Fundación Valparaíso in Mojacar, Milkwood in Český Krumlov, CZ and Disquiet in Lisbon, Portugal.

She received degrees in English and literature from California State University, Long Beach (CSULB), holds a Masters in Professional Writing from the University of Southern California (USC). She was named after the Millicent Library in Fairhaven, MA.

Borges Accardi also works as a freelance writer (technical writing and instructional design).

Reading series
In 2012, Millicent Accardi started the "Kale Soup for the Soul" reading series featuring Portuguese-American writers.  The first edition was in Chicago at the famous Chicago Cultural Center. Since then, "Kale Soup for the Soul" readings have featured over 25 different writers, in regional readings in cities such as San Francisco, Seattle, Iowa City, Providence, Rhode Island, Boston and San José—as part of a new wave of Portuguese-American Literature. In 2013, there were "Kale Soup for the Soul" readings at the Mass Poetry Festival in Salem, the Valente Library in Cambridge, and the Portuguese Consulate in Boston. There were also readings at Brown University, UMass Dartmouth, and Rhode Island College as well as workshops with local students from Shea high school in Rhode Island (80 students in attendance).  There was a conference in Lisbon which featured a panel about Portuguese-American Literature as well as a round table with many of the writers who have participated in "Kale Soup for the Soul".

Works
Poetry collections:
 Quarantine Highway (FlowerSong Press 2022)
 Through a Grainy Landscape (New Meridian Arts Press, 2021)
 Only More So (Salmon Poetry, 2016) 
 Injuring Eternity (Mischievous Muse Press, December, 2010)

Chapbooks:
 Woman on a Shaky Bridge (Finishing Line Press, 2010)

Awards
2020: Foundation for Contemporary Arts FCA in New York, (Covid grant) 
2015: Fulbright Fellowship for Poetry 
2013: US@PT travel grant from Fundação Luso-Americanato (FLAD)
2014/2012: Center for Cultural Innovation, Creative Capacity Quick Grant
2011/2012: CantoMundo Fellowship
CantoMundo Fellows
2010: Formby Fellowship, Special Collections Library at Texas Tech University, Lubbock, Texas
2003: California Arts Council Grant for Poetry
2002: Barbara Deming Foundation
1998: Alden B. Dow Fellowship (unable to attend)
1997-98: National Endowment for the Arts Literature Fellowship for Poetry
1992: Elizabethe Kempthorne Endowment for Creative Writing at USC
1991: State of California Pre-Doctoral Grant

Memberships
MLA
American Portuguese Studies Association
PEN/America
Associated Writing Programs Associate
Portuguese-American Women's Association
CantoMundo
USC Alumni Association
Society for Technical Communication

References

External links
 Author website
 Profile at Poetry Foundation

 Woman on a Shaky Bridge - by Millicent Borges Accardi, Review by Robert Manaster, Rattle, June 5, 2010
 The Human Experience, Review by Georgia Ann Banks-Martin in Her Circle EZine, April, 2010
 Review in Onomotopoeia Magazine by Jara Jones, June 2010
 Review by Michael Northern in Word Gathering, 2010
 Review in Poets Quarterly by Joan Hana, Issue 4, winter 2010
 Review in Boston Literary Magazine Fall 2009
 Review in New York Journal of Books by David Cooper, Jan. 1, 2010
 To the Other Side and Back Again: Millicent Borges Accardi’s Woman on a Shaky Bridge, Review by Chris Crawford, June 2010
 Review in Rufous City by Jessica Bixel, Aug. 27, 2010
 Hiram Poetry Review Issue #72 (June 2011) by Kathi Stafford
 Review of Injuring Eternity Gifts of Dawn, May 2011 Review by Linda Scott
 Review of Woman on a Shaky Bridge by Reinaldo Silva, Ph.D.Dept. Línguas e Culturas, Universidade de Aveiro, Portugal
 The Compulsive Reader, April 2011 by Sheri Fresonke Harper
 Blue Moon Northeast, June 2011 by Meg Harris
 Word Gathering, June 2011 by Mike Northern
 New Mirage, July 2011 by Linda Benninghoff
 Review of Injuring Eternity in The Poetry Kit UK, by Lesley Burt, June 2011
 Portuguese-American Literature Bibliography

American women poets
Date of birth missing (living people)
Living people
National Endowment for the Arts Fellows
Poets from California
People from Topanga, California
Writers from Long Beach, California
American people of Portuguese descent
California State University, Long Beach alumni
University of Southern California alumni
20th-century American poets
21st-century American poets
20th-century American women writers
21st-century American women writers
Wilson Classical High School alumni
Year of birth missing (living people)